Andranofanjava is a municipality in Madagascar. It belongs to the district of Antsiranana II, which is a part of Diana Region. According to 2001 census the population of Andranofanjava was 4,413.

Only primary schooling is available in town. The majority 99.5% of the population are farmers.  The most important crops are rice and maize.  Services provide employment for 0.5% of the population.

References and notes 

Populated places in Diana Region